St Matthew's is an electoral ward in Preston, Lancashire, England. The ward is adjacent to the larger Ribbleton  to the east but is considered to be an area with a distinct community of its own.

The ward is named after the large St Matthew's Church within its borders.
Three members of Preston City Council, elected 'in thirds' in first past the post elections each year, are returned from the ward.

The ward forms part of the Lancashire County Council electoral division of Preston East.

Demographics
The 2001 census showed a population of 6,462 within St Matthew's, of which over half (58%) classed themselves as Christian. The next highest religious population is Muslim at just under 17%. The population at the 2011 Census was 8,187.

Nearly half of the adult population have no education qualifications, one of the highest figures in the city of Preston.

Boundaries
St Matthew's is a rectangle sized ward with the city centre and Deepdale at one side,  Fishwick to the south, and  Ribbleton to the east.  Preston Prison is at the south-west of the ward, which is otherwise populated by terraced housing and shopping units and warehouses. A number of Preston Bus and Stagecoach services run across the ward towards Ribbleton, Longridge and beyond.

Current members

Demographics
From the 2001 census, St George's ward had a population of 5,049. Of this figure, 26.7% described themselves as Muslim.

See also
Preston local elections

References

 Existing ward arrangements

Wards of Preston
Geography of Preston